Ham & Cheese is a 2004 Canadian comedy film directed by Warren P. Sonoda. The film stars Mike Beaver and Jason Jones. Both of them also wrote and produced it. It is about two talentless actors who attempt to make it in showbiz with persistence, ready to do anything to reach their dreams without letting go.

Cast
Mike Beaver as Richard Wolanski
Jason Jones as Barry Goodson
Samantha Bee as Beth Goodson
Dave Foley as Tom Brennemen
Jennifer Baxter as Katie Reed
Von Flores as A.D. (MOW)
Scott Thompson as Floyd
Polly Shannon as Lucy (MOW Detective)
Boyd Banks as Barry's Boss at Canadian Theatre Company
Victoria Pratt as Herself
Ann Bisch as Phyllis
Catherine Black as Casting Complex Director (Cola)
Vladimir Jon Cubrt as Ralph
Adam Reid as Casting Director

Award nominations
The film was nominated in 2005 for six Canadian Comedy Awards as follows:
Warren P. Sonoda for "Film - Pretty Funny Direction"
Jennifer Baxter for "Film - Pretty Funny Performance - Female"
Samantha Bee for "Film - Pretty Funny Performance - Female"
Mike Beaver for "Film - Pretty Funny Performance - Male"
Jason Jones for "Film - Pretty Funny Performance - Male"
Mike Beaver and Jason Jones for "Film - Pretty Funny Writing"

References

External links

2004 films
Canadian comedy films
English-language Canadian films
Films directed by Warren P. Sonoda
2000s English-language films
2000s Canadian films